Think and Grow Rich is a book written by Napoleon Hill released in 1937 and promoted as a personal development and self-improvement book. He claimed to be inspired by a suggestion from business magnate and later-philanthropist Andrew Carnegie. However there is no evidence that the two ever met.

The book is considered a classic in the personal development genre and has been widely influential in shaping the way people think about success and wealth.

History 
In 1935, Napoleon Hill's second wife Florence filed for and received a divorce. In 1936 Napoleon met Rosa Lee Beeland when she attended one of his lectures, he proposed the next day and they were soon married. Unable to afford a place of their own they moved in with Napoleon and Florence's son Blair in New York City. Following a few months of this living arrangement Blair's wife Vera left due to Napoleon Hill's harassment and abuse with Blair following soon after. Before leaving Blair gave his father and Rosa a loan to continue work on their new book, Think and Grow Rich.

Think and Grow Rich was published in 1937 and became a major commercial success. Rosa Lee Beeland contributed substantially to the authoring and editing of Think and Grow Rich. Napoleon and Rosa divorced in 1940 with Rosa retaining the royalties from Think and Grow Rich as they had been put in her name to protect them any claims on them by Florence and her children. Napoleon and Rosa never repaid Blair for the $300 loan with Rosa taunting Blair about the matter.

Summary
Think and Grow Rich is based on Hill's earlier work The Law of Success, claims to be the result of more than twenty years of study of many individuals who had amassed personal fortunes. Hill studied their habits and drew some 16 "laws" to be applied to achieve success. Think and Grow Rich condenses them, providing the reader with 14 principles in the form of a "Philosophy of Achievement".

The main theme of the book is that anyone can achieve success and wealth by following a certain set of principles. Hill identifies these principles as the "13 Steps to Riches," which include developing a positive mental attitude, setting clear and specific goals, developing a plan to achieve those goals, taking action, and maintaining a strong belief in oneself and one's abilities.

The 13 steps to riches, as outlined in "Think and Grow Rich" by Napoleon Hill, are:

1.	Desire: Start with a strong desire or burning ambition to achieve a specific goal or outcome.

2.	Faith: Have unwavering faith in yourself and your ability to achieve your goal.

3.	Autosuggestion: Use positive self-talk and affirmations to reinforce your beliefs and goals.

4.	Specialized knowledge: Acquire the knowledge and skills needed to achieve your goal.

5.	Imagination: Use your imagination to visualize your goal and see yourself achieving it.

6.	Organized planning: Develop a detailed plan of action to achieve your goal.

7.	Decision: Make a firm decision to follow through on your plan and never give up.

8.	Persistence: Keep working towards your goal, even when faced with obstacles or setbacks.

9.	Power of the Master Mind: Surround yourself with like-minded people who support and encourage you.

10.	The Mystery of Sex Transmutation: Use the power of your sexual energy to fuel your desire and drive.

11.	The Subconscious Mind: Tap into the power of your subconscious mind to help you achieve your goals.

12.	The Brain: Use your brain to analyze and plan, and to make decisions and take action.

13.	The Sixth Sense: Trust your intuition and inner guidance to help you make the right decisions and achieve your goals.

Accuracy 
It is sometime in 1908 that Hill claims his pivotal conversation with Andrew Carnegie happened, however there is no record of the two meeting and he spent much of the year on the run from the authorities following a lumber fraud in Alabama. Hill did not claim to have met Carnegie until after his death in 1918. Aside from Hill's writings, there are no accounts of the meeting taking place. Carnegie biographer David Nasaw stated that he "found no evidence of any sort that Carnegie and Hill ever met" or "that the book was authentic."

There are no known records of Hill meeting the famous men he claimed to have interviewed; that is, besides a brief encounter with Thomas Edison.

Influence 
First published during the Great Depression, it remains the biggest seller of Napoleon Hill's books. BusinessWeek magazine's Best-Seller List ranked it the sixth best-selling paperback business book 70 years after it was published. Think and Grow Rich is listed in John C. Maxwell's A Lifetime "Must Read" Books List.

Hill's biographers would later say this book sold 20 million copies over 50 years, although as Richard Lingeman remarks in his brief biography, "Alice Payne Hackett's '70 Years of Best Sellers' suggests the amount was considerably less."

Notes

Further reading

Success Through A Positive Mental Attitude, by Napoleon Hill and W. Clement Stone. .
Earl Nightingale Reads Think and Grow Rich [The essence of Napoleon Hill's Think and Grow Rich], by Earl Nightingale. .
The Biblical Companion Guide to Think & Grow Rich, by Joshua J. Finley. 

Business books
Self-help books
1937 non-fiction books